The Sorex emo skink (Emoia sorex) is a species of lizard in the family Scincidae. It is found in Indonesia.

References

Emoia
Reptiles described in 1895
Reptiles of Indonesia
Endemic fauna of Indonesia
Taxa named by Oskar Boettger